The Chinese football league system or Chinese football league pyramid, refers to the hierarchically interconnected league system for the Chinese Football Association (CFA) that currently consists of 8 tiers with 29 individual leagues, in a series of partially interconnected leagues that are bound together by the principle of promotion and relegation.

A significant feature is that there is not only leagues in the system, but also some cup competitions participate, which allows clubs in the system to make multiple promotions in one season. Only the regular leagues are listed below.

By the "Notice of the General Office of the State Council on the Issuance of the General Plan for the Reform and Development of Football in China" dated 8 March 2015, the CFA has set a target of an eight-level league system, which is scheduled to be realised by 2030:

 Professional levels

1. CFA Super League

2. CFA China League

3. CFA Division Two League

 Amateur levels

4. CFA Member Association Champions League Finals

5. CFA Member Association Champions League Regional Competitions

6. Leagues of CFA member associations

7. Leagues of city-level associations (include prefecture-level and county-level cities)

8. Leagues of county-level associations (include counties and autonomous counties)

The target has principally followed the proposed structure in its implementation.

Men's system 
The top 3 tiers are nationwide professional competitions, Super League, China League, Division Two League, have promotion and relegation between the leagues.

The hierarchical system continues and levels have progressively more parallel divisions, which each cover progressively smaller geographic areas. 50 CFA Member Associations organise different forms of competitions and 22 of them organise regular leagues, which locate from tier 4 of the system. Only Zhejiang Super League has feeder leagues.

CFA Member Association Champions League, is the amateur football finals each season, involving 64 teams from across the country. All teams registered with CFA member associations are required to gain access to the CFA Member Association Champions League in various ways, including participating and winning in leagues organised by the member association (tier 4 leagues). This is the only way to enter top 3 tiers and be a part of the professional system.

Structure

Tier 1-3: Professional leagues 
The highest level of football in China is the Super League which was founded in 2004. The China League and Division Two League are currently the second and third division.

Tier 4-7: CFA member associations leagues 
The CFA has 50 member associations, 31 are the province-level, 13 are city-level and the rest are Xinjiang Production and Construction Corps FA, Federation of University Sports of China, Chinese Enterprise Sports Association, China Locomotive Sports Association and China Coal Mine Sports Association. 22 associations organise regular leagues with internal promotion and relegation, with the most tiers being the Xiamen FA and Shanghai FA, which have four tiers. Regardless of the type of competition organised by member associations, they all have a variable number of CFA Member Association Champions League positions.

4 top clubs of CMCL receive promotion to the Division Two League.

Tier 6-8: City-level associations leagues 
Only the Zhejiang Football Association has implemented a feed league system, although the rule is strict. When there is a team withdraw in the Division B (tier 5), teams in city-level leagues (tier 6) will get the opportunity to be promoted.

Women's system 
The three levels of women's football are structured as follows:

See also
List of Hong Kong, Macau and Taiwanese players in Chinese football leagues

References

External links
Chinese Football Association 
China League History

 
China